Neptosternus is a genus of beetles in the family Dytiscidae, containing the following species:

 Neptosternus africanus Peschet, 1917
 Neptosternus alluaudi Régimbart, 1903
 Neptosternus annettae Hendrich & Balke, 2000
 Neptosternus arnecornelii Hendrich & Balke, 2003
 Neptosternus aterrimus Hendrich & Balke, 1997
 Neptosternus babetteae Hendrich & Balke, 1997
 Neptosternus bellus Hendrich & Balke, 1997
 Neptosternus biharensis Vazirani, 1963
 Neptosternus biltoni Hendrich & Balke, 1997
 Neptosternus bimaculatus Hendrich & Balke, 1997
 Neptosternus borneensis Hendrich & Balke, 1997
 Neptosternus boukali Hendrich & Balke, 1999
 Neptosternus brevior Régimbart, 1899
 Neptosternus cebuensis Hendrich & Balke, 2000
 Neptosternus ceylonicus Holmen & Vazirani, 1990
 Neptosternus chumphon Balke & Hendrich, 1998
 Neptosternus circumductus Régimbart, 1899
 Neptosternus compsus Guignot, 1953
 Neptosternus coomani Peschet, 1923
 Neptosternus corporaali Zimmermann, 1924
 Neptosternus distinctus Omer-Cooper, 1970
 Neptosternus fasciatus Omer-Cooper, 1970
 Neptosternus feryi Balke, Hendrich & C.M.Yang, 1997
 Neptosternus hafti Hendrich & Balke, 1997
 Neptosternus hedychrous Guignot, 1955
 Neptosternus horai Vazirani, 1953
 Neptosternus hydaticoides (Régimbart, 1877)
 Neptosternus jacobsoni Zimmermann, 1927
 Neptosternus jaechi Hendrich & Balke, 1997
 Neptosternus jani Hendrich & Balke, 1997
 Neptosternus kalimantanensis Hendrich & Balke, 1997
 Neptosternus kaszabi Satô, 1972
 Neptosternus kerala Hendrich & Balke, 1999
 Neptosternus kodadai Hendrich & Balke, 1997
 Neptosternus kolakaensis Balke & Hendrich, 1998
 Neptosternus krikkeni Hendrich & Balke, 1997
 Neptosternus latissimus Balke, Hendrich & C.M.Yang, 1997
 Neptosternus leyi Hendrich & Balke, 2000
 Neptosternus maculatus Hendrich & Balke, 1997
 Neptosternus magnus Hendrich & Balke, 1997
 Neptosternus malayanus Hendrich & Balke, 1997
 Neptosternus manfredi Hendrich & Balke, 1997
 Neptosternus martinae Hendrich & Balke, 2001
 Neptosternus mazzoldii Hendrich & Balke, 1997
 Neptosternus meridianus Omer-Cooper, 1970
 Neptosternus minimus Hendrich & Balke, 1997
 Neptosternus moelleri Hendrich & Balke, 1997
 Neptosternus montalbanensis Hendrich & Balke, 2000
 Neptosternus muluensis Hendrich & Balke, 1997
 Neptosternus namcattienensis Hendrich & Balke, 1997
 Neptosternus neisiorum Hendrich & Balke, 1997
 Neptosternus nigeriensis Omer-Cooper, 1970
 Neptosternus nigritus Hendrich & Balke, 1997
 Neptosternus noteroides Hendrich & Balke, 1997
 Neptosternus nuperus Guignot, 1954
 Neptosternus oberthueri Régimbart, 1903
 Neptosternus oblongus Régimbart, 1895
 Neptosternus ornatus Sharp, 1882
 Neptosternus pocsi Satô, 1972
 Neptosternus psephotus Guignot, 1955
 Neptosternus pseudocorporaali Hendrich & Balke, 1997
 Neptosternus pseudohydaticoides Hendrich & Balke, 1997
 Neptosternus pumicatus Guignot, 1949
 Neptosternus quadrimaculatus Hendrich & Balke, 1997
 Neptosternus rajasthanicus Vazirani, 1975
 Neptosternus regimbarti Peschet, 1917
 Neptosternus resartus Guignot, 1954
 Neptosternus riedeli Hendrich & Balke, 1997
 Neptosternus rotroui (Pic, 1924)
 Neptosternus sabahensis Hendrich & Balke, 1997
 Neptosternus sarawakensis Hendrich & Balke, 1997
 Neptosternus schoedli Hendrich & Balke, 1997
 Neptosternus siamensis Hendrich & Balke, 1997
 Neptosternus silvester Guignot, 1960
 Neptosternus simulator Omer-Cooper, 1970
 Neptosternus sinharajaicus Holmen & Vazirani, 1990
 Neptosternus sombuicus Guignot, 1954
 Neptosternus starmuehlneri Wewalka, 1973
 Neptosternus strnadi Hendrich & Balke, 1997
 Neptosternus subopacus Guignot, 1956
 Neptosternus sumatrensis Régimbart, 1895
 Neptosternus taiwanensis Hendrich & Balke, 1997
 Neptosternus taprobanicus Sharp, 1890
 Neptosternus thailandicus Hendrich & Balke, 1997
 Neptosternus thiambooni Balke, Hendrich & C.M.Yang, 1997
 Neptosternus togianensis Hendrich & Balke, 1997
 Neptosternus tricuspis Guignot, 1954
 Neptosternus tropicus Guignot, 1954
 Neptosternus verenae Hendrich & Balke, 1997
 Neptosternus vietnamensis Hendrich & Balke, 1997
 Neptosternus viktordulgeri Balke & Hendrich, 2001
 Neptosternus wewalkai Balke, Hendrich & C.M.Yang, 1997
 Neptosternus winkelmanni Hendrich & Balke, 1997

References

Dytiscidae